The Ministry of Economy and Innovation of the Republic of Lithuania is a government department of the Republic of Lithuania. Its operations are authorized by the Constitution of the Republic of Lithuania, decrees issued by the president and prime minister, and laws passed by the Seimas (Parliament). Its mission is to develop positive legal and economic environment for economic development and ensure public welfare and employment.

The Ministry of Economy and Innovation is responsible for handling government business in the following areas: business environment, export, innovation, state-owned enterprises (SOEs), EU support to business, public procurement and tourism.

Institutions 
 Agency for Science, Innovation and Technology (Mokslo, inovacijų ir technologijų agentūra)
 Central Procurement Organisation (Centrinė perkančioji organizacija)
 Enterprise Lithuania (Versli Lietuva)
 Governance Coordination Centre (Valdymo koordinavimo centras)
 Information Society Development Committee (Informacinės visuomenės plėtros komitetas)
 Invest Lithuania (Investuok Lietuvoje)
 Investment and Business Guarantees/INVEGA (Investicijų ir verslo garantijos)
 Kaunas Science and Technology Park (Kauno mokslo ir technologijų parkas)
 Klaipėda Science and Technology Park (Klaipėdos mokslo ir technologijų parkas)
 Lithuania Travel (Keliauk Lietuvoje)
 Lithuanian Business Support Agency (Lietuvos verslo paramos agentūra)
 Lithuanian Exhibition and Congress Centre/LITEXPO (Lietuvos parodų ir kongresų centras LITEXPO)
 Lithuanian Innovation Center (Lietuvos inovacijų centras)
 Lithuanian Metrology Inspectorate (Lietuvos metrologijos inspekcija)
 Lithuanian National Accreditation Bureau (Nacionalinis akreditacijos biuras)
 Lithuanian Standards Board (Lietuvos standartizacijos departamentas)
 SOLVIT (a part of the EU program with a local center under ministerial jurisdiction)
 State Enterprise Centre of Registers (Registrų centras)
 Projektų ekspertizė (Lithuanian language only)
 Toksika (Lithuanian language only)

Ministers

References

Economy
Lithuania
 
Ministries established in 1918